The France women's junior national handball team is the national under-19 handball team of France. Controlled by the French Handball Federation it represents the country in international matches.

The team is referred as the "U20" and "U20F". 

Head coach Éric Baradat was previously assistant coach of the women's senior national team (2002–2013 and for the 2016 Olympics games).

History

World Championship
 Champions   Runners up   Third place   Fourth place

European Championship
 Champions   Runners up   Third place   Fourth place

References

External links
Official website of the French Handball Federation  
U20F Team page

Women's handball in France
Women's national junior handball teams
Handball